Boghicea is a commune in Neamț County, Western Moldavia, Romania. It is composed of four villages: Boghicea, Căușeni, Nistria and Slobozia.

Boghicea village was founded by a monk named Boghiță who had a small hermitage in the forest and sheltered other citizens. In 1784, Gheorghe Stroescu and his wife Adela began construction on a stone and brick church on their estate with their own finances.

The village was the site of a 1944 tank battle where the Romanians led by Lt. Ion S. Dumitru repulsed Soviet forces, causing heavy casualties.

References

Communes in Neamț County
Localities in Western Moldavia